State Highway 87 (SH 87) runs for  between Galveston, Texas (at a terminus shared with Interstate 45 and Spur 342) to U.S. Highway 59 and U.S. Highway 84 in Timpson, Texas.

Highway 87 has a notable stretch between Sea Rim State Park and High Island, Texas that has been washed out repeatedly over the decades and has been closed continuously since 1990. The storm surge from Hurricane Jerry which made landfall on October 15, 1989, left the highway in a state of disrepair.
While talk about rebuilding the destroyed segment of State Highway 87 happens from time to time (for example, in 1998), there is no serious effort underway to do so.

A section of highway which is now known as the Warden Michael C. Pauling Memorial Highway stretches from the Intracoastal Waterway Bridge to Sabine Pass on Texas 87.

History

SH 87 was originally designated on August 21, 1923 from Orange to Milam. The route was the previously proposed to be SH 8A before being renumbered. On September 16, 1926, SH 87 was extended to Port Arthur, though this was not taken over for maintenance until January 1, 1927. An extension via High Island to Galveston was planned to be taken over when TxDOT could afford it. On March 19, 1930, the north end was shortened to Hemphill. On August 1, 1930, SH 87 extended back to Milam, replacing SH 21 Spur. On May 5, 1931, it was extended again, this time to High Island. On November 22, 1933, SH 87 extended to Carter's Store. On March 17, 1936, SH 87 replaced the section of SH 124 from High Island to Galveston. On December 22, 1936, SH 87 was extended to its current terminus in Timpson. On May 23, 1939, SH 87 Spur was designated to Wiergate. On September 26, 1939, The spurs were changed to Spur 24 (Wiergate) and Spur 69 (Deweyville). On August 20, 1952, SH 87 was no longer concurrent with US 96 from Center to Carter's Store. In 1970, road machinery used in its construction accidentally dug up several cannonballs and crumbling kegs of black powder about 10 miles west of Sabine Pass. Further excavation eventually produced more kegs of black powder and several hundred cannonballs. The ammunition had been buried there by Confederate soldiers in what were the ditches of Fort Manhassett in 1865. Fort Manhassett was a series of earthworks constructed by the Confederacy in 1863 to defend the western approaches to Sabine Pass. On January 28, 1987, SH 87 was extended 4.1 miles west to Spur 342, replacing a section of US 75, which was decommissioned south of Dallas.

On November 19, 1926, a spur, SH 87A was designated from  Bronson to Hemphill. On March 19, 1930, this route was erroneously omitted from the state highway log. On November 30, 1932, this road was added back to the state highway log, but was renumbered as SH 184. Another SH 87A was designated on November 19, 1928, from Deweyville to Louisiana. This was redesignated as Spur 69 on September 26, 1939.

Failed bridge proposal
Two ferry routes, and up to five ferries, currently operate on Galveston Bay, taking passengers from Port Bolivar to Galveston Island.  Because of increasing traffic, especially during summer months, TxDOT was studying the possibility of building a bridge to connect Galveston Island or Pelican Island to the Bolivar Peninsula; however, the decision was made not to build the bridge.

Major intersections

References

External links

087
Transportation in Chambers County, Texas
Transportation in Galveston, Texas
Transportation in Galveston County, Texas
Transportation in Jefferson County, Texas
Transportation in Newton County, Texas
Transportation in Orange County, Texas
Transportation in Sabine County, Texas
Transportation in Shelby County, Texas